Asuka is both a unisex Japanese given name and a Japanese surname.

Possible writings
Asuka can be written using different combinations of kanji characters. Here are some examples:

飛鳥, "fly, bird"
明日香, "tomorrow, fragrant"
明日花, "tomorrow, flower"
明日華, "tomorrow, flower/splendor"
亜寿花, "Asia, long life, flower"

The name can also be written in hiragana あすか or katakana アスカ.

Notable people with the given name Asuka

 Asuka (wrestler) (born 1981), a Japanese professional wrestler
 Asuka (wrestler, born 1998), a Japanese professional wrestler also known as Veny outside of Japan
 Princess Asuka (明日香皇女), Japanese princess during the Asuka Period
 , Japanese-Jamaican male track and field sprinter
 , Japanese handball player
 , Japanese pop singer
 , Japanese biathlete
 , a Japanese singer
 , a Japanese singer who is the leader of the Hinoi Team (named after her)
 Asuka Hisa Los Angeles-based artist, educator and curator
 Asuka Katsura (桂 明日香), author of Le Portrait de Petit Cossette manga
 , Japanese actress, fashion model and gravure idol
 , Japanese fashion model, entertainer
 , a Japanese actor
 , (明日香), a Japanese idol
 , Japanese actress and gravure model
 , Japanese voice actress
 , Japanese voice actress
 , Japanese volleyball player
 , Japanese actress, gravure idol, and tarento
 , Japanese voice actress
 , Japanese idol, singer, actress and fashion model
 Asuka Sakai, video game musicians notable for Katamari Damacy and Soulcalibur II
 , Japanese classical violinist
 , Japanese badminton player
 , Japanese voice actress
 , Japanese football player
 , Japanese hurdler

Notable people with the surname Asuka
 , a Japanese actress
 , a Japanese model and former adult video actress
 Aska (singer-songwriter), Ryo Asuka (飛鳥 涼, born 1958), a Japanese singer-songwriter, formerly a member of Chage and Aska

Fictional characters
 Asuka (アスカ), a character from Bakuryū Sentai Abaranger
 Asuka (飛鳥), a shikigami who serves the priestess Kikyo in the InuYasha series
 Asuka (明日架), in Log Horizon
 Asuka (飛鳥), in the Senran Kagura series
 Asuka (アスカ) in the game Sweet Home
 Asuka Connell (アスカ・コネル), the daughter of Bisca and Alzack Connell in Fairy Tail
 Asuka Domon (土門 飛鳥), a character in the manga series Inazuma Eleven
 Asuka Hirama (平間 あすか), a minor character in Haikyū!!
 Asuka Honda (本田 飛鳥) in Asuka 120%
 Asuka Kasen in Grand Theft Auto III
 Asuka Kazama (風間 飛鳥) in Tekken series.
 Asuka Kojo (古城 アスカ), a supporting character in Danball Senki W
 Asuka Mizunokoji (水乃小路 飛鳥) in Urusei Yatsura
 Asuka Motomura (本村 明日香) in Battle Royale II
 Asuka Murase (村瀬 明日香), a former girlfriend of Yoji's in Weiss Kreuz
 Asuka Ootorii (大鳥居 あすか) in Magical Girl Spec-Ops Asuka
 Asuka Saginomiya ((鷺ノ宮 飛鳥) in Ranma ½
 Asuka Shin (アスカ・シン), Dyna's human form in the Ultra Series Ultraman Dyna
 Asuka Tachibana (橘 あすか) in the anime s-CRY-ed
 Asuka Tanaka (田中 あすか), a character in the novel series Sound! Euphonium
 Asuka Toyama (戸山 明日香), in the anime BanG Dream!.
 Asuka Tenjouin (天上院 明日香), the main female character from Yu-Gi-Oh! GX
 Asuka Langley Soryu (惣流 アスカ・ラングレー) in Neon Genesis Evangelion
 Asuka Sugo (菅生 あすか) in Cyberformula

 Daiki Asuka (飛鳥 大貴) or Asuka Jr. (アスカ Jr.), in Saint Tail
 Kenji Asuka (明日香 健二) or Midoranger, in Himitsu Sentai Goranger
 Momoko Asuka (飛鳥 ももこ) in Ojamajo Doremi
 Ryo Asuka (飛鳥 了) in Devilman
 Ryu Asuka (飛鳥 竜) or Yarinin Toppa (槍忍 突破) from Sekai Ninja Sen Jiraiya
 Shin Asuka (シン・アスカ) in Mobile Suit Gundam SEED Destiny
 Torajirou Asuka (飛鳥 虎次郎), a character from Digimon Universe: App Monsters

Others
Asuka-Fujiwara is a cluster of archaeological sites

Japanese unisex given names
Japanese feminine given names
Japanese-language surnames